Laurie Kelly may refer to:

 Laurie Kelly (footballer) (1925–1972), English former footballer
 Laurie Kelly Sr. (1883–1955), Australian politician
 Laurie Kelly (politician) (1928–2018), Australian politician

See also
Lawrence Kelly (disambiguation)